Figure skating at the 2011 Winter Universiade included an ice dancing event for senior level skaters. The short dance was held on February 1 and the free dance on February 3, 2011.

Results

References

External links
 Detailed results

Winter Universiade
Winter Universiade
Ice dancing